Umurah is a 1999 Maldivian drama film directed by Ali Musthafa. Produced by Hassan Ali and Ahmed Sharan Ali under Dash Studio, the film stars Reeko Moosa Manik, Hussain Sobah, Jamsheedha Ahmed and Zeenath Abbas in pivotal roles.

Premise
Dr. Riyaz (Reeko Moosa Manik) often wakes up to a vivid dream and decides to take a break from work. He proposes to a heartbroken Jamsheedha (Jamsheedha Ahmed) who refuses to extend their relationship beyond friendship since she is deeply in love with someone else. Slightly convinced by her nurse friend, Raheema (Zeenath Abbas) and concerned about the condition of Riyaz's mother, Zulfa (Aminath Rasheedha), a heart patient, Jamsheedha reluctantly accepts Riyaz's marriage proposal. As she marries, she finds herself to be two months pregnant from an extra-marital affair she previously had with Niman (Hussain Sobah) who dies in the hands of Dr. Riyaz due to his negligence.

Cast 
 Reeko Moosa Manik as Dr. Riyaz
 Hussain Sobah as Niman
 Jamsheedha Ahmed as Jamsheedha
 Zeenath Abbas as Raheema
 Koyya Hassan Manik as Hameed
 Satthar Ibrahim Manik
 Aminath Rasheedha as Zulfa
 Fauziyya Hassan as Niman's mother
 Ihusana
 Ibrahim Ahmed

Soundtrack

References

1999 films
Maldivian drama films
1999 drama films
Dhivehi-language films